Peristernia ustulata is a species of sea snail, a marine gastropod mollusk in the family Fasciolariidae, the spindle snails, the tulip snails and their allies.

Description
The length of the shell attains 24.8 mm.

Distribution
Peristernia ustulata lives in waters in the Western Pacific including Indonesian, Australian, and Chinese seas.; also off Australia (Torres Strait)

References

 Liu, J.Y. [Ruiyu] (ed.). (2008). Checklist of marine biota of China seas. China Science Press. 1267 pp.

External links
 Reeve, L. A. (1847). Monograph of the genus Turbinella. In: Conchologia Iconica, or, illustrations of the shells of molluscous animals, vol. 4, pl. 1-13 and unpaginated text. L. Reeve & Co., London.
 Pilsbry, H. A. (1901). New mollusca from Japan, the Loo Choo Islands, Formosa and the Philippines. Proceedings of the Academy of Natural Sciences of Philadelphia. 53: 193-208 
 Küster, H. C. & Kobelt, W. (1844-1876). Die geschwäntzen unbewehrten Purpurschnecken. Erste Hälfte: Turbinella und Fasciolaria. In Abbildungen nach der Natur mit Beschreibungen. Mollusca Gasteropoda: Purpuracea: Purpurschnecken; Dritte Abtheilung. Systematisches Conchylien-Cabinet von Martini und Chemnitz, ed.2

Fasciolariidae
Gastropods described in 1847